G42, G-42 or G.42 may refer to:

 HMS Lincoln (G42), a United Kingdom Royal Navy destroyer
 SMS G42, an Imperial German Navy torpedo boat
 G42 Shanghai–Chengdu Expressway in China
 Victorian Railways G class locomotive number
 Glock 42 pistol
 G42 (TV channel), an upcoming television channel in early 2017